Ioannis Skoularikis (1 August 1928 – 15 September 2008) or Yannis Skoularikis (Γιάννης Σκουλαρίκης) was a Greek politician of the Panhellenic Socialist Movement (PASOK) and cabinet member under Andreas Papandreou.

He was a lawyer, specializing in criminal law and labor law.

He was Minister of Public Order from 21 October 1981 to 9 May 1985, Alternate Minister of the Interior from 22 June 1988 to 17 March 1989, when he was appointed Minister of Justice, holding the post until 2 June. He then served again as Minister of Labor from 8 July 1994 to 15 September 1995.

As Minister of Public Order he was responsible for the creation of a new police force, the present-day Hellenic Police, which was created in 1984 by merging the old Gendarmerie and City Police, in order to create a more modern and democratic law enforcement agency. He also supported the creation of labor unions inside the Police, despite strong opposition from conservatives.

He died in September 2008.

References

1928 births
2008 deaths
PASOK politicians
Justice ministers of Greece
Labour ministers of Greece
Greek MPs 1974–1977
Greek MPs 1977–1981
Greek MPs 1981–1985
Greek MPs 1985–1989
Greek MPs 1989 (June–November)
Greek MPs 1989–1990
Greek MPs 1990–1993
Greek MPs 1993–1996
Greek MPs 1996–2000
Greek MPs 2000–2004
Ministers of Public Order of Greece
Members of the Panhellenic Liberation Movement
People from Elis